Advanced Placement (AP) Calculus (also known as AP Calc, Calc AB / Calc BC or simply AB / BC) is a set of two distinct Advanced Placement calculus courses and exams offered by the American nonprofit organization College Board. AP Calculus AB covers basic introductions to limits, derivatives, and integrals. AP Calculus BC covers all AP Calculus AB topics plus additional topics (including integration by parts, Taylor series, parametric equations, vector calculus, and polar coordinate functions).

AP Calculus AB
AP Calculus AB is an Advanced Placement calculus course. It is traditionally taken after precalculus and is the first calculus course offered at most schools except for possibly a regular calculus class. The Pre-Advanced Placement pathway for math helps prepare students for further Advanced Placement classes and exams.

Purpose
According to the College Board:

Topic outline
The material includes the study and application of differentiation and integration, and graphical analysis including limits, asymptotes, and continuity. An AP Calculus AB course is typically equivalent to one semester of college calculus.
Analysis of graphs (predicting and explaining behavior)
Limits of functions (one and two sided)
Asymptotic and unbounded behavior
Continuity
Derivatives
Concept
At a point
As a function
Applications
Higher order derivatives
Techniques
Integrals
Interpretations
Properties
Applications
Techniques
Numerical approximations
Fundamental theorem of calculus
Antidifferentiation
L'Hôpital's rule
Separable differential equations

AP Calculus BC

Purpose
According to the College Board,

Topic outline
AP Calculus BC includes all of the topics covered in AP Calculus AB, as well as the following: 
 Convergence tests for series
 Taylor series 
Parametric equations
 Polar functions (including arc length in polar coordinates and calculating area)
Arc length calculations using integration
 Integration by parts 
 Improper integrals 
 Differential equations for logistic growth
 Using partial fractions to integrate rational functions

AB sub-score distribution

AP Exam 
The College Board intentionally schedules the AP Calculus AB exam at the same time as the AP Calculus BC exam to make it impossible for a student to take both tests in the same academic year, though the College Board does not make Calculus AB a prerequisite class for Calculus BC. Some schools do this, though many others only require precalculus as a prerequisite for Calculus BC. The AP awards given by College Board count both exams. However, they do not count the AB sub-score piece of the BC exam.

Format
The structures of the AB and BC exams are identical. Both exams are three hours and fifteen minutes long, comprising a total of 45 multiple choice questions and six free response questions. They are usually administered on a Tuesday morning in May.

The two parts of the multiple choice section are timed and taken independently.

Students are required to put away their calculators after 30 minutes have passed during the Free-Response section, and only at that point may begin Section II Part B. However, students may continue to work on Section II Part A during the entire Free-Response time, although without a calculator during the later half.

Scoring
The multiple choice section is scored by computer, with a correct answer receiving 1 point, with omitted and incorrect answers not affecting the raw score. This total is multiplied by 1.2 to calculate the adjusted multiple-choice score.

The free response section is hand-graded by hundreds of educators each June. The raw score is then added to the adjusted multiple choice score to receive a composite score. This total is compared to a composite-score scale for that year's exam and converted into an AP score of 1 to 5.

For the Calculus BC exam, an AB sub-score is included in the score report to reflect their proficiency in the fundamental topics of introductory calculus. The AB sub-score is based on the correct number of answers for questions pertaining to AB-material only.

See also 

 AP Physics C: Mechanics and AP Physics C: Electricity and Magnetism
 AP Precalculus
Glossary of calculus
 Integration Bee
 Math 55 at Harvard University
 Mathematics education in the United States
Stand and Deliver (1988 film)

References

External links
AP Calculus AB
College Board description of the AP Calculus AB course content
College Board description of the AP Calculus AB examination
AP Calculus BC
College Board description of the AP Calculus BC course content
College Board description of the AP Calculus BC examination

Further reading

Mathematics education in the United States
Calculus
Advanced Placement

zh:大学先修课程#科目